Margaret E. Ward is a well-known entrepreneur, journalist and broadcaster based in Dublin, Ireland. She has worked in The Irish Times, Sunday Times and as a presenter on Newstalk radio She's currently CEO of Clear Ink and Broadly Speaking.

Early and personal life
Margaret E. Ward is a native of New York, with Irish parents. She moved to Dublin in 1995 where she still lives in Dublin with her husband and two children.

Entrepreneur
Ward is the founder and managing director of Clear Ink a leadership consultancy firm based in Dublin. Ward is also the founder of the public speaking training company Broadly Speaking (2012). In 2010, she founded a networking group in Ireland called Women on Air to give women the skills and confidence to express their expert opinions on radio and TV. She has been recognised by many organisations including: Silicon Republic's - Women Invent 100 - "The Community Builders: 13 women helping women in STEM"; Silicon Republic's - the Women Invent 100 list - the Community Builders; Irish Tatler: Business Women of Influence List 2015; Image Businesswoman of the Year shortlist; Women Mean Business Awards shortlist (Social Entrepreneurship) and for the Women Mean Business awards.

Journalist
Ward started writing professionally while still in university and her first front-page story appeared in Gannett Newspapers (New York) in 1990. Ward started her career in Irish journalism at the Irish Times in 1996. She worked there as an investigative journalist, personal finance columnist and news reporter. In 2000, she joined the Sunday Times to head up their first Money section in Ireland and she remained with them until 2005. She returned to the Irish Times and wrote two business columns Cents and Nonsense and Platform. Ward also worked as the breakfast business presenter on Newstalk radio during Ireland's bailout period on weekday mornings between 2010 and 2011. She writes occasional editorials for Independent Newspapers on diversity and business. Ward has appeared on television and radio, including tonight with Vincent Browne, Tubridy on 2FM, The History Show, RTE Radio 1 Saturday View, TV3, BBC and National Public Radio (USA) NPR. Ward has been awarded the Law Society of Ireland's Justice Media award for social and campaigning journalism and the ICL Science & Technology journalism award.

She served on the RTÉ Board of directors from 2015 to 2020 and was appointed to the board of Fáilte Ireland in 2019. She previously served on the board of European Movement Ireland, as chair of Women on Air (2010-2013) and the Business Journalists Association of Ireland.

References

External links
About Clear Ink
Margaret E. Ward bio
Women on Air

Irish chief executives
Living people
Year of birth missing (living people)